Bystrowiella is an extinct genus of bystrowianid reptiliomorph from upper Middle Triassic (Ladinian age) deposits of Kupferzell and Vellberg, northern Baden-Württemberg, Germany. It was first named by Florian Witzmann, Rainer R. Schoch and Michael W. Maisch in 2008, from a complete osteoderm fused with tip of neural spine (SMNS 91034, the holotype), partial osteoderms (SMNS 91036, 91037) and vertebrae (SMNS 81698, 81871–81874, 81876, 81877, 81879). The type species is Bystrowiella schumanni. The genus is named in honour of Dr. Alexey Bystrow, a Russian paleontologist and the species in honour of Schumann family. Bystrowiellas closest relative was Synesuchus.

References

Triassic tetrapods of Europe
Chroniosuchians
Prehistoric vertebrates of Europe
Fossil taxa described in 2008